Vincenzo de Cesati (1806–1883) was an Italian botanist from Milan.

He studied natural history and law at the University of Vienna, and afterwards worked as a volunteer at the Collegium Nacionale de Vercelli. From 1868 to 1883 he was director of the botanical garden at Naples. The majority of his plant collection is now preserved at the botanical institute of the University of Rome.

The plant genus Cesatia from the family Apiaceae is named after him.

Works 
With Giovanni Passerini (1816-1893) and Giuseppe Gibelli (1831-1898), he was author of "Compendio della flora italiana", a compendium of Italian flora. Other works by Cesati include:
 Stirpes Italicae: iconografia universale delle piante italiane (Pyrole, Milan, 1840)
 Saggio di una bibliografia algologica italiana (Accademia reale delle Scienze, Naples, 1882)

References 
 This article is based on a translation of an equivalent article at the French Wikipedia.

19th-century Italian botanists
1806 births
1883 deaths
Scientists from Milan